Dari Lu (also known as Dirili) is a village in Minjavan-e Sharqi Rural District, Minjavan District, Khoda Afarin County, East Azerbaijan Province, Iran. At the 2006 census, its population was 429, in 84 families.  According to a more recent reliable statistics the population is 399 people in 102 families, which indicates a significant increase in the number of households while population is declining.

In the wake of White Revolution (early 1960s) a clan of Mohammad Khanlu tribe, comprising 40 households,  used Derilou as their winter quarters.

At present, most inhabitants are farmers. Still, during hot days of late spring and summer they move to tents in  Chaparli summer camp to provide relatively large sheep herds of the village with better grazing opportunity.

Before the 1940s the village enjoyed relative fame as the seat of Hossein Khan Leysi, who was a feudal from the ruling family of the Mohammad Khanlu tribe. After the Khan's second marriage to a commoner girl from upland region, he moved to Abbasabad, and Derilou lost its former importance. Still the Khan's sons married and the family was expanded. At present half of the village's inhabitants are descendants of Hossein Khan.

References 

Populated places in Khoda Afarin County